Drôme (Occitan: Droma; Arpitan: Drôma) is the southernmost department in the Auvergne-Rhône-Alpes region of Southeastern France. Named after the river Drôme, it had a population of 516,762 as of 2019. Drôme's prefecture is Valence.

History 
Saint-Vallier in Drôme was the birthplace of one of France's most famous courtesans, the noble-born Diane de Poitiers (1499–1566), long-term mistress of King Henri II (1519–1559).

The French National Constituent Assembly set up Drôme as one of the original 83 departments of France on March 4, 1790, during the French Revolution. The territory formed part of the former French province of Dauphiné. The original Drôme department contained the exclave of Orange, which was also part of the former province of Dauphiné. In 1792, following the annexation of Comtat Venaissin, Drôme acquired the newly created district of Carpentras while Orange was ceded to Bouches du Rhône. In 1793, the district of Carpentras was ceded to the newly formed department of Vaucluse, giving the Drôme its modern-day borders.

Geography
Drôme lies within the region of Auvergne-Rhône-Alpes. Drôme is bordered by Ardèche to the west, Isère to the north and east, Hautes-Alpes to the east, Alpes-de-Haute-Provence to the southeast and Vaucluse to the south. The northwestern tip of the department is only 3 miles (5 km) from the Loire border.

The boundaries of the department have changed several times with the incorporation of the Comtat Venaissin in 1792 and the creation of the Vaucluse department in 1793. Drôme surrounds an exclave of the Vaucluse department, the Canton of Valréas (Enclave des Papes).

The commune of Montfroc forms an small salient which was surrounded by the department of Alpes-de-Haute-Provence, which is lookly similar to the small salients of Newmarket in Suffolk, Dieveniškės in Lithuania, Bogatynia in Poland, West Bengal and Sikkim in India, and the Wakhan Corridor in Afghanistan. It also the pene-exclave of the department.

The department contains 363 communes. The smallest commune in France, Rochefourchat, with a population only of one person, is in Drôme.

Climate

The Drôme department is in a zone of transition between the oceanic climate of Lyon, the continental climate to the north and the Mediterranean climate of Provence to the south. In the Rhône valley, the meeting of the mild humid southern Mediterranean air masses with the colder northern air mass sometimes causes particularly violent thunderstorms and snowstorms.

In the northern hills near Tain-l'Hermitage (15 km north of Valence), the climate is a mixture of oceanic and semi-continental climates. Rainfall occurs throughout the year with the most falling in spring and autumn. The summers are moderated by storms and the mistral does not blow hard. Saint-Donat-sur-l'Herbasse has a moderate temperature of 3 °C in January and 21 °C in July due to the Lyonnic climate, where more precipitation falls in summer than winter.

The influence of the mountains is evident in the east. In the Vercors Plateau, the mountain climate is wet due to the oceanic influences from the north. The average annual temperature at Lus la Croix Haute at altitude 1061m is 7.3 °C and the annual rainfall is 1051mm. The Diois (southern Vercors) and the Baronnies are dry regions due to the Mediterranean climate. The mistral is less influential here and this region has minimal rainfall. The lowest temperatures in January at Nyons is 0.3 °C but 1.4 °C at Pierrelatte.

The Valence plane is a transition zone between the Mediterranean influence and the northern cold climate. Summers are warmer than in the northern regions, and the increase in sunlight and heat is evident upon the appearance of Mediterranean vegetation in the region. The temperatures are moderate between Lyon and Montélimar. Valence's average temperature in January is 3.8 °C and 22 °C in July. The mistral here blows harder.

From Montélimar, the climate can be considered to be that of a Mediterranean climate. Near the highway, the change of vegetation is particularly visible near the stream at Donzère, particularly due to the change of the soil profile. The most southern part of the department clearly exhibits a Méso-Mediterranean climate with the reinforcement of the mistral and a hotter summer due to the rarity of storms. Most rainfall occurs in autumn and the winters are milder than the rest of the Drôme. Pierrelatte has an average temperature of 5 °C in January and 23 °C in July.

Demographics
The inhabitants of the department are called Drômois.

Principal towns

The most populous commune, home to about 1/8 of the department's population, is Valence, the prefecture. As of 2019, there are 6 communes with more than 10,000 inhabitants:

Economy
Most of the economic activity of the Drôme department is located in the west of the department, along the Rhône valley. This area which contains most of the population of the department, also has accessible transportation, such as the A7 autoroute and the rail routes LGV Rhône-Alpes and LGV Méditerranée. Economic activity in Valence was boosted by the creation of the Valence TGV line in 2001.

Statistics
Total employment (2004): 158 930 (about 10.6% is self-employed)
Unemployment rate (2006): 9.9%
Jobs per sector of activity (2005)
Agriculture: 6.0%
Industry: 20.4%
BTP: 6.8%
Commerce: 15.0%
Services: 51.8%
Qualification of Jobs (1999)
Farmers: 4.0%
CEO: 7.8%
Executives: 9.6%
Technicians and associate professionals: 23.0%
Employees: 27.2%
Labourers: 28.5%
Average annual salary (2004)
CEO: €53 113 
Executives: €39 265 
Technicians and associate professionals: €22 927 
Employees: €15 688 
Labourers: €16 344 
Apprentices and labourers : €7 498

Tourism
The Drôme benefits from an excellent image in the view of tourists. Attendance has grown steadily (+4% between 2006 and 2007), faster than the neighbouring departments of Ardèche and the Vaucluse (+1%).
Number of overnight stays in 2007: 7,994,076
The Tourism Committee of the Drôme department's website La Drôme, du Vercors à la Provence received over 44000 visits in 2007, along with a new TV station Drome.tv

Main companies

Politics
The president of the Departmental Council is Marie-Pierre Mouton, elected in May 2017.

Current National Assembly Representatives

Tourism

Sport activities in Drôme include:
 in winter: skiing, cross-country skiing,  snow-shoeing
 in summer: excursions, mountain biking in the mountainous area

The Drôme River is also a great place to practice canoëing and kayaking. In the spring the water flow even allows you to practice rafting. The Saoü Forest is known for its climbing paths.

See also
Cantons of the Drôme department
Communes of the Drôme department
Arrondissements of the Drôme department
Marie Louis Descorches

References

External links

  Prefecture website
  Departement Council website

 
1790 establishments in France
Departments of Auvergne-Rhône-Alpes
Economy of Auvergne-Rhône-Alpes
States and territories established in 1790